Tyne Bridge was a parliamentary constituency in the north east of England, represented in the House of Commons of the Parliament of the United Kingdom, from 1983 until 2010. It elected one Member of Parliament (MP) by the first past the post system of election.

History
The constituency was created as a result of the Boundary Commission for England review of parliamentary seats for the 1983 general election following the reorganisation of local government under the Local Government Act 1972 which brought the metropolitan county of Tyne and Wear into existence. It covered central Tyneside in Tyne and Wear, with part of the constituency being north of the River Tyne in Newcastle (including the city centre), and the other part being south of the river, in Gateshead. It is named after the Tyne Bridge that crosses the river. It included parts of six different constituencies which had been in existence before the review (see Infobox).

It was abolished at the review of parliamentary representation coming into effect for the 2010 general election, being replaced by the re-established constituency of Gateshead south of the River Tyne, and by the Newcastle upon Tyne Central constituency to the north.

Tyne Bridge was a safe seat for the Labour Party throughout its existence.

Boundaries

1983–1997 

 The City of Newcastle wards of Benwell, Elswick, Scotswood, and West City; and
 the Metropolitan Borough of Gateshead wards of Bede, Bensham, Dunston, and Teams.

1997–2010 

 The City of Newcastle wards of Benwell, Elswick, Scotswood, and West City; and
 the Metropolitan Borough of Gateshead wards of Bede, Bensham, Deckham, Dunston, Saltwell, and Teams. 

Deckham and Saltwell wards were added to the seat from the abolished Gateshead East constituency.

Members of Parliament

Election results

Elections of the 1980s

Elections of the 1990s

Elections of the 2000s

See also 
 History of parliamentary constituencies and boundaries in Tyne and Wear

Notes and references

Parliamentary constituencies in Tyne and Wear (historic)
Constituencies of the Parliament of the United Kingdom established in 1983
Constituencies of the Parliament of the United Kingdom disestablished in 2010